Alice Remsen is the assumed title of one of the earliest scheduled television segments, pre-dating The Television Ghost. She appeared on the station W2XCD during 1931. On her segment she performed songs. 

Nothing remains of the series today, as it aired live, and practical methods to record live television did not exist until late 1947 (though there is a  poor-quality experimental recording of BBC TV of the 1930s which suggests mechanical television could be entertaining. Additionally, from the early electronic television era some German programming of the 1930s survives as it was shot on film instead of being live).

Scheduling
An early episode aired at 9:00PM, followed by a Felix the Cat cartoon.

A later episode aired at 9:00PM, followed by a film called The Early Bird.

References

External links
Alice Remsen on IMDb

1931 American television series debuts
1931 American television series endings
1930s American television series 
American live television series
Lost television shows 
American music television series 
Black-and-white American television shows